Jakub Šiman (born 7 January 1995) is a Czech football player who plays for Zbrojovka Brno.

References
 Profile at FC Zbrojovka Brno official site
 Profile at FAČR official site

1995 births
Living people
Czech footballers
Czech First League players
FC Zbrojovka Brno players
Association football goalkeepers
Czech National Football League players
Sportspeople from Plzeň